João Alves Filho  (3 July 1941 – 24 November 2020) was a Brazilian politician and civil engineer.

Career
He served as governor of the state of Sergipe from 1983 to 1987, from 1991 to 1995, and from 2003 to 2007.  From 1987 to 1990 he was Brazilian Minister of the Interior.

He was married to senator Maria do Carmo Alves. He was accused of accepting bribes in public works projects, as uncovered in Operação Navalha.

He died on 24 November 2020, aged 79 after being hospitalized at Sírio Libanês Hospital in Brasília due to a cardiac arrest and, posteriorly, diagnosed with COVID-19.

See also
 List of mayors of Aracaju

References

1941 births
2020 deaths
Governors of Sergipe
Government ministers of Brazil
Brazilian civil engineers
People from Aracaju
20th-century Brazilian engineers
20th-century Brazilian politicians
21st-century Brazilian politicians
Deaths from the COVID-19 pandemic in Federal District (Brazil)